Chaubey is a surname. Notable people with the surname include:

Abhishek Chaubey (born 1977), Indian film director and screenwriter
Brij Bihari Chaubey (1940–2014), Indian Sanskrit scholar
Kalyan Chaubey (born 1976), Indian footballer
Lalmuni Chaubey (1942–2016), Indian politician
Vinod Chaubey (died 2009), Indian police officer
((Varun Choubey))born 1999, Indian Rbi banker

See also
Choubey